

People
 Akkineni Nageswara Rao, Great Telugu film actor.

Places
 Akkineni Nageswara Rao College, sometimes called ANR College
 Antwerp International Airport (IATA code)

Entities
 Agence nationale de la recherche, a French funding agency for research
 Alleanza Nazzjonali Repubblikana, a Maltese pressure group
 Alliance Nationale Républicaine (National Republican Alliance), an Algerian political party
 Americans for Nonsmokers' Rights, an American organization that lobbies in support of smoking bans
 Asociación Nacional Republicana (National Republican Association), a Paraguayan political party
 Australian National Railways Commission - Australian rail operator from 1975 until 1987
 Agencja Nieruchomości Rolnych - Polish estate agency

Land use and planning
 Approval Not Required (Under the Subdivision Control Law), a process for subdividing land in Massachusetts, USA, under MGL Chapter 41

Mathematics
 Absolute neighborhood retract, a type of topological space (mathematics)

Military
 Alaska NORAD Region, an alternate phrase for the Eleventh Air Force
 Agence Nationale de Renseignements, a government intelligence agency of the Zaire
 Aeronautica Nazionale Repubblicana, the air force of the Italian Social Republic during World War II

Music
 Anew Revolution, a heavy metal band from Austin, Texas
 Awesome New Republic, a two-piece indie band from Miami, Florida

Society
 Adult Nursing Relationship, a type of erotic relationship (see Erotic lactation)

Technology
 Active Noise Reduction,  more commonly Active noise control
 Ambiguous name resolution, a search algorithm for LDAP implemented in Microsoft's Active Directory
 "Application not Responding", a message in Android operating system
 Atmosphere Normale de Reference, a standard used with air compressors
 Automatic Number-plate Recognition, more commonly ANPR (automatic number-plate recognition)